Maurice Donahue may refer to:

 Maurice H. Donahue (1864–1928), United States federal judge
 Maurice A. Donahue (1918–1999), American politician in Massachusetts